This is a list of compositions by Friedrich Kiel.

Piano

Piano Solo
15 Kanons im Kammerstil, Op. 1
Capriccietto, Op. 4
Drei Romanzen, Op. 5
Vier zweistimmige Fugen, Op. 10
Große Polonaise, Op. 14
Elf Melodien, Op. 15
Variationen & Fuge, Op. 17
Zehn Pianoforte-Stücke, Op. 18
Zwei Impromptus, Op. 19
Nachtklänge. Drei Pianofortstücke, Op. 21
Zwei Capricen, Op. 26
Tarantelle, Op. 27
Suite (Sonate, Impromptu, Scherzo, Notturno), Op. 28
Reiseerinnerungen (1. Heft), Op. 38
Reiseerinnerungen (2. Heft), Op. 41
Fantasie e-Moll, Op. 56
Fantasie cis-Moll, Op. 58/1
Drei Humoresken, Op. 59
Fantasie in As-Dur, Op. 68
Drei Klavierstücke, Op. 71
Sechs Klavierstücke, Op. 72
Sechs Impromptus, Op. 79
Fünf Etüden
Hongroise
Zwei Nocturnes
Albumblatt
Bolero

Piano, four hands
Zwei kleine Sonaten for Piano, four hands, Op. 6
Variations on an Original Theme for Piano, four hands, Op. 23
Four Humoresques for Piano, four hands, Op. 42
Waltz for Piano, four hands, Op. 47
Waltz for Piano, four hands, Op. 48

Organ
Three Fantasien

Chamber music

Violin and Piano
Sonata in D major for violin and piano, Op. 16
Variationen über ein schwedisches Volkslied (Variations on a Swedish Folk Song), Op. 37
Two Solopieces for violin and viano, Op. 70

Cello and Piano
Reisebilder for Cello and Piano, Op. 11
3 Pieces for Cello and Piano, Op. 12
Cello Sonata in A Minor, Op. 52
Little Suite for Cello and Piano, Op. 77
Cello Sonata in D Major

Piano Trio
Piano Trio #1 in D Major, Op. 3
Piano Trio #2 in A Major, Op. 22
Piano Trio #3 in Es Major, Op. 24
Piano Trio #4 in cis Minor, Op. 33
Piano Trio #5 in G Major, Op. 34
Piano Trio #6 in A Major, Op. 65/1
Piano Trio #7 in G Minor, Op. 65/2
Piano Trio in G Major

Piano Quartet
Piano Quartet #1 in A Minor, Op. 43
Piano Quartet #2 in E Major, Op. 44
Piano Quartet #3 in G Major, Op. 50

String Quartet
String Quartet #1 in A Minor, Op. 53/1
String Quartet #2, Op. 53/2
Waltz for String Quartet, Op. 73
New Waltzes for String Quartet, Op. 78

Piano Quintet
Piano Quintet #1 in A Major, Op. 75
Piano Quintet #2 in C Minor, Op. 76

Other
Viola Sonata in D Major, Op. 67
Three Romances for viola and Piano, Op. 69
Five Duos for Clarinet and Bassoon

Orchestral

Piano and Orchestra
Piano Concerto in B flat Major, Op. 30
Fantasy for Piano and Orchestra

Other
Overture for Orchestra, Op. 6

Choral music
 Requiem in F minor, Op. 20
 Missa solemnis, Op. 40
 Requiem in A-flat major, Op. 80
 Six Motets, Op. 82
 Und ob ich schon wanderte im finstern Thal (Psalm 23:4), Op. 82/1
 Siehe, wie fein und lieblich ist es (Psalm 133:1, 3), Op. 82/2
 Wie lieblich sind deine Wohnungen (Psalm 84:1, 2), Op. 82/3
 Aus der Tiefe rufe ich, Herr, zu dir (Psalm 130), Op. 82/4
 Die mit Tränen säen (Psalm 126:5), Op. 82/5
 Herr, wie lange willst du meiner so gar vergessen (Psalm 13:2-4), Op. 82/6
 The Star of Bethlehem, Op. 83

Lieder
Liederkreis, Op. 31

External links
 List of compositions (in German)

Kiel, Friedrich